Nicola Geuer and Anna Zaja were the defending champions, but Zaja chose not to participate. Geuer partnered Eva Wacanno, but they lost in the first round to Amina Anshba and Alina Silich.

Camilla Rosatello and Sofia Shapatava won the title, defeating Romy Kölzer and Lena Rüffer in the final, 6–2, 6–4.

Seeds

Draw

References
Main Draw

Ladies Open Hechingen - Doubles